Hunter Hunted may refer to:
Hunter Hunted (band), an indie pop band from Los Angeles
Hunter Hunted (video game) - a platform computer game released in 1996 by Sierra Entertainment 
Hunter Hunted (TV series) - a documentary series on the National Geographic Channel
Hunter/Hunted - a 1978 episode of The Professionals